Natasha Pulley (born 4 December 1988) is a British author. She is best known for her debut novel, The Watchmaker of Filigree Street, which won a Betty Trask Award.

Education

She was educated at Soham Village College, New College, Oxford, and the University of East Anglia (MA in Creative Writing (Prose Fiction), 2012).

Works

Her debut novel, The Watchmaker of Filigree Street, was published in 2015 and was set in Victorian London. It won a 2016 Betty Trask Award. Her second novel, The Bedlam Stacks, was published in 2017, and her third, The Lost Future of Pepperharrow, was released in the UK in 2019. All three are set in the same fictional universe. Pulley's fourth book, an alternative history, The Kingdoms, was released in May 2021. In June 2022, her fifth book, The Half Life of Valery K, came out.

Bibliography

Watchmaker

Other novels

Collections

References

1988 births
Living people
Alumni of New College, Oxford
Alumni of the University of East Anglia
21st-century British novelists
English fantasy writers
English women novelists
21st-century English women writers